Quwat Jabal is a citrus-flavored carbonated soft drink sold in the Middle East. It is produced by Coca-Cola.

It is lemon lime flavored, made with real lemon and lime juice.

References 

Coca-Cola brands
Lemon-lime sodas